The Salem Gunpowder Raid (also known as Leslie's Retreat) refers to a February 1775 standoff between the British military and colonists in the town of Salem, Massachusetts, which was ended by a compromise agreement.

Background 
On Sunday, February 26, 1775, the 64th British Regiment of the Line, Lieutenant-Colonel Alexander Leslie commanding, landed at Marblehead from Castle William in Boston Harbor. The Marblehead people were at afternoon service. The regiment, with loaded muskets and bayonets fixed, marched to Salem under orders to seize military stores concealed there.

Salem
As soon as its destination was known, Major John Pedrick of Marblehead rode "across lots" to Salem, and gave the alarm. Arrived at Salem, where the movement was delayed at New Mills by the tearing up of the bridge over South River, the troops were guided by a Loyalist towards "North Fields," a section reached by a drawbridge over North River. Here they found the draw raised to arrest their progress. Some flatboats lying in the stream were promptly scuttled by their owners in the face of the troops. Across the river a large number of people were gathering, armed as opportunity offered.

Colonel Timothy Pickering, then a young militia officer (afterwards Secretary of War and Secretary of State under Washington) was among them. Parson Thomas Barnard hastening from his pulpit in the North Church close by, had reached the spot, and was trying to mediate. Captain John Felt was at Colonel Leslie's side with purpose, afterward declared, of throwing him into the river in case the regulars had fired.

The Honorable Richard Derby, whose ships' guns, loaned to the Province, were the objects of the search, and Colonel David Mason, the Provincial agent for mounting them for the field, were present, insisting, as did Captain James Barr, Major Joseph Sprague, and others who had disabled the flatboats, that Colonel Leslie was marching not on the King's highway, but in a private lane, that the bridge was the property of individual proprietors, that the draw would not be let down on his order, and that, as neither war nor martial law had been declared, he would advance at his peril. "Find the guns, if you can," said Derby. "Take them, if you can. They will not be surrendered." Leslie said his orders were to cross the river, and he would do so. Meanwhile the guns had been removed to a safer place, and a mounted messenger, Benjamin Daland, had posted to Danvers, spreading the alarm. The concourse of citizens was fast increasing, and help was arriving from Beverly and Danvers.

Negotiation
Night was approaching, and at dusk Colonel Leslie agreed that, if the draw should be lowered, he would march but a few rods beyond, abandon the search, and withdraw his regiment. The terms were accepted and observed. The regiment returned to Marblehead through streets lined with armed men, and re-embarked for Boston. Their march had been arrested and their purpose defeated.

Edmund Burke summed up the situation in these memorable words : " Thus ended their first expedition, without effect, and happily without mischief. Enough appeared to show on what a slender thread the peace of the Empire hung, and that the least exertion of the military power would certainly bring things to extremities."

Hon. Robert S. Rantoul, having made researches in the matter of the history of Leslie's retreat, has expressed himself as surprised that the historian Dr. Bentley, in his voluminous notes, had made no mention of it; yet it was of sufficient importance for Burke to set it down in his magazine published in England at that time as "the first military enterprise of the colonies."

It seems that Leslie was held and delayed at the bridge by a quibble raised as to whether the bridge was a portion of the King's highway or private property. During this delay the cannon in North Fields were 
removed, and thus saved to the patriots.

He stated that this bridge was originally built by the town ; but, as it proved of slight advantage except to land-owners on the other side the town apportioned it off in small sections to the proprietors of the land, for them to care for, reserving, however, some eighteen feet and the draw as town property. This would indicate that most of the bridge was private property at the time of Colonel Leslie's visit, but that the draw was town property.

Legacy
The town of Salem erected a monument to the event, which states: "In the Revolution, the first armed resistance to the Royal Authority was made at this bridge, 26 Feb. 1775 by the people of Salem.  The advance of 300 British Troops, led by Lt. Col. Leslie and sent by Gen. Gage to seize munitions of war, was here arrested."

In 2002, the park along Bridge St. in Salem was slated to be named after the event.

See also
 Sarah Tarrant

References

External links
 Account of Leslie's Retreat at the North Bridge in Salem, on Sunday Feb'y 26, 1775
 Register, 1904

American Revolutionary War
History of Salem, Massachusetts